Ballymoreen, also written Ballymurreen  is a civil parish in County Tipperary, Ireland. It is one of 21 civil parishes in the barony of Eliogarty.

As a Church of Ireland parish, it was in the diocese of Cashel. The ruins of a church are still to be seen in Ballymurreen townland, at the junction of a minor road from Holycross with the R639, but there was no parish church in modern times, members of the established church attending services in the neighbouring parish of Borrisleigh, at Littleton which is located between the exclave of Rathcunikeen and the main part of Ballymoreen.

Townlands of the civil parish
Ballymurreen contains seven townlands: 
 Ballymurreen, 
 Curraheen, 
 Liskeveen, 
 Newtown, 
 Parkstown,
 Rahinch and 
 Rathcunikeen (which is actually detached from the rest of the parish, forming an enclave within the neighbouring parish of Borrisleigh).
Together they amount to a total of 2870 statute acres; of these about 500 acres are bog and most of the remainder is used for dairying and tillage.

Ballymurreen Castle
The site of Ballymurreen Castle is just across the road from the ruins of the church.

See also
List of civil parishes of Tipperary

References

 Ballymoreen